Memecylon floridum is a species of plant in the Myrtales order family Melastomataceae. It is found in Peninsular Malaysia and Singapore. It is threatened by habitat loss.

References

floridum
Vulnerable plants
Taxonomy articles created by Polbot